Saraya Abdeen is an Egyptian historical TV drama series,  The first season was aired on MBC on 29 June 2014, written by Kuwaiti author Heba Meshari Hamada, directed by Amr Arafa, produced by Mahmood Shokri, and starring Qusai Khouli, Yousra, Nour, May Kassab, Ghada Adel and Nelly Karim. The series focuses on life of Isma'il Pasha who was the Khedive of Egypt and Sudan from 1863 to 1879, with his wives and concubines and their Intrigues on each other with their servants and slaves. A second season was released in April 2014 which was directed by Shadi Abu Al-Oyoun Al-Soud.

Cast
 Qusai Khouli as Isma'il Pasha
 Yousra as Hoshiyar Qadin
 Nour as Ferial Qadin
 Nelly Karim as Princess Safinaz and her twin sister Julnar
 May Kassab as Shafaq Nur Hanim
 Ghada Adel as Concubine Shams Qadin
 Reem Mustafa as Concubine Shams Qadin (2nd season)
 Sawsan Arsheed as Jeshm Afet Hanim
 Alaa Mursi as Sulayman
 Dalia Mostafa as Narges
 Carmen Lebbos as Nazli
 Nabil Issa as Detective Ismail
 Mahmood Al-Bazawi as Abdu
 Anoushka as Kali Mami
 Khaled Sarhan as Mustafa Fadhel
 Salah Abdullah as Palace doctor
 Abdul Hakim Qafttan as Fakhr Al-Deen
 Nahed El Sebai as Nakhla
 Yosef Fawzi as Rostom
 Safaa Al-Tookhi as Sur khanem
 Nahir Amin as Dada Ahraqat
 Enji Al-Muqqadem as Qamar
 Mayar Al-Ghitti as Nashaa Del
 Mennah Arfa as Nafisa
 Ahmad Samir as Omer
 Rauf Mustafa as Muhammad Ali
 Samar Mursi as Shams
 Ahmad Khaled as Tewfik Pasha
 Mohammad Al-Fakhrani as Fuad I
 Marwa Mahran as Jamalat
 Abeer Faroq as Asmahan
 Shrif Layla as Ibrahim Pasha
 Muhamad Mahran as Hussein Kamel
 Rania Shahin as Maya
 Amr Bader as Barakat
 Ehsan Saleh as Berlentah
 Nafartari Jamal as Aziza
 Dunia Al-Masri as Jamila
 Eman Al-Sayed as Fatma
 Noor Hany as Princess Tawhida
 Wael Najem as Zenhom
 Yorgo Shalhoub as Ernest
 Rasha Amin as Maria
 Nera Aref as Nilufer
 Majdi Bader as Alewa
 Ayman Al-Shewi as Stephen
 Heba Abdul Aziz as Sophia
 Sharif Shawqi as Gustav Eiffel
 Duaa Adel as Tatiana
 Rafif Hamdi as Rayana
 Abdul Adhem Hamad Alah as Anbar
 Ola Bader as Bakinam
 Hesham Husam as Osman
 Mustafa Hamisa as Cohen
 Paul Iskandar as Palace chef Maurice
 Hatem Jamil as Etris
 Yosef Al-Asall as Ferdinand de Lesseps
 Ali Mansour as French photographer

See also
 List of Egyptian television series

References

External links
 Saraya Abdeen on IMDb
 Saraya Abdeen on elcinema

Historical television series
Egyptian drama television series
2014 Egyptian television series debuts
2015 Egyptian television series endings